Hubert Lederer Dreyfus (October 15, 1929 – April 22, 2017) was an American philosopher and professor of philosophy at the University of California, Berkeley. His main interests included phenomenology, existentialism and the philosophy of both psychology and literature, as well as the philosophical implications of artificial intelligence. He was widely known for his exegesis of Martin Heidegger, which critics labeled "Dreydegger".

Dreyfus was featured in Tao Ruspoli's film Being in the World (2010), and was among the philosophers interviewed by Bryan Magee for the BBC Television series The Great Philosophers (1987).

The Futurama character Professor Hubert Farnsworth is partly named after him, writer Eric Kaplan having been a former student.

Life and career
Dreyfus was born on 15 October 1929, in Terre Haute, Indiana, to Stanley S. and Irene (Lederer) Dreyfus.

He attended Harvard University from 1947. With a senior honors thesis on Causality and Quantum Theory (for which W. V. O. Quine was the main examiner) he was awarded a BA summa cum laude in 1951 and joined Phi Beta Kappa. He was awarded an MA in 1952. He was a Teaching Fellow at Harvard in 1952-1953 (as he was again in 1954 and 1956). Then, on a Harvard Sheldon traveling fellowship, Dreyfus studied at the University of Freiburg over 1953–1954. During this time he had an interview with Martin Heidegger. Sean D. Kelly records that Dreyfus found the meeting 'disappointing.' Brief mention of it was made by Dreyfus during his 1987 BBC interview with Bryan Magee in remarks that are revealing of both his and Heidegger's opinion of the work of Jean-Paul Sartre.

Between 1956 and 1957, Dreyfus undertook research at the Husserl Archives at the University of Louvain on a Fulbright Fellowship. Towards the end of his stay, his first (jointly authored) paper "Curds and Lions in Don Quijote" would appear in print. After acting as an instructor in philosophy at Brandeis University (1957–1959), he attended the Ecole Normale Supérieure, Paris, on a French government grant (1959–1960).

From 1960, first as an instructor, then as an assistant and then associate professor, Dreyfus taught philosophy at the Massachusetts Institute of Technology (MIT). In 1964, with his dissertation Husserl's Phenomenology of Perception, he obtained his PhD from Harvard. (Due to his knowledge of Husserl, Dagfinn Føllesdal sat on the thesis committee but he has asserted that Dreyfus "was not really my student.")  That same year, his co-translation (with his first wife) of Sense and Non-Sense by Maurice Merleau-Ponty was published.

Also in 1964, and whilst still at MIT, he was employed as a consultant by the RAND Corporation to review the work of Allen Newell and Herbert A. Simon in the field of artificial intelligence (AI). This resulted in the publication, in 1965, of the "famously combative" Alchemy and Artificial Intelligence, which proved to be the first of a series of papers and books attacking the AI field's claims and assumptions. The first edition of What Computers Can't Do would follow in 1972, and this critique of AI (which has been translated into at least ten languages) would establish Dreyfus's public reputation. However, as the editors of his Festschrift noted: "the study and interpretation of 'continental' philosophers... came first in the order of his philosophical interests and influences."

Berkeley
In 1968, although he had been granted tenure, Dreyfus left MIT and became an associate professor of philosophy at the University of California, Berkeley (winning, that same year, the Harbison Prize for Outstanding Teaching). In 1972 he was promoted to full professor. Though Dreyfus retired from his chair in 1994, he continued as professor of philosophy in the Graduate School (and held, from 1999, a joint appointment in the rhetoric department). And he continued to teach philosophy at UC Berkeley until his last class in December 2016.

Dreyfus was elected a fellow of the American Academy of Arts and Sciences in 2001.  He was also awarded an honorary doctorate for "his brilliant and highly influential work in the field of artificial intelligence" and his interpretation of twentieth century continental philosophy by Erasmus University.

Dreyfus died on April 22, 2017.

His younger brother and sometimes collaborator, Stuart Dreyfus, is a professor emeritus of industrial engineering and operations research at the University of California, Berkeley.

Dreyfus' criticism of AI 

Dreyfus' critique of artificial intelligence (AI) concerns what he considers to be the four primary assumptions of AI research. The first two assumptions are what he calls the "biological" and "psychological" assumptions. The biological assumption is that the brain is analogous to computer hardware and the mind is analogous to computer software. The psychological assumption is that the mind works by performing discrete computations (in the form of algorithmic rules) on discrete representations or symbols.

Dreyfus claims that the plausibility of the psychological assumption rests on two others: the epistemological and ontological assumptions.  The epistemological assumption is that all activity (either by animate or inanimate objects) can be formalized (mathematically) in the form of predictive rules or laws. The ontological assumption is that reality consists entirely of a set of mutually independent, atomic (indivisible) facts. It's because of the epistemological assumption that workers in the field argue that intelligence is the same as formal rule-following, and it's because of the ontological one that they argue that human knowledge consists entirely of internal representations of reality.

On the basis of these two assumptions, workers in the field claim that cognition is the manipulation of internal symbols by internal rules, and that, therefore, human behaviour is, to a large extent, context free (see contextualism). Therefore, a truly scientific psychology is possible, which will detail the 'internal' rules of the human mind, in the same way the laws of physics detail the 'external' laws of the physical world. However, it is this key assumption that Dreyfus denies. In other words, he argues that we cannot now (and never will be able to) understand our own behavior in the same way as we understand objects in, for example, physics or chemistry: that is, by considering ourselves as things whose behaviour can be predicted via 'objective', context free scientific laws. According to Dreyfus, a context-free psychology is a contradiction in terms.

Dreyfus's arguments against this position are taken from the phenomenological and hermeneutical tradition (especially the work of Martin Heidegger). Heidegger argued that, contrary to the cognitivist views (on which AI has been based), our being is in fact highly context-bound, which is why the two context-free assumptions are false. Dreyfus doesn't deny that we can choose to see human (or any) activity as being 'law-governed', in the same way that we can choose to see reality as consisting of indivisible atomic facts... if we wish. But it is a huge leap from that to state that because we want to or can see things in this way that it is therefore an objective fact that they are the case. In fact, Dreyfus argues that they are not (necessarily) the case, and that, therefore, any research program that assumes they are will quickly run into profound theoretical and practical problems. Therefore, the current efforts of workers in the field are doomed to failure.

Dreyfus argues that to get a device or devices with human-like intelligence would require them to have a human-like being-in-the-world and to have bodies more or less like ours, and social acculturation (i.e. a society) more or less like ours. (This view is shared by psychologists in the embodied psychology (Lakoff and Johnson 1999) and distributed cognition traditions. His opinions are similar to those of robotics researchers such as Rodney Brooks as well as researchers in the field of artificial life.)

Daniel Crevier writes: "time has proven the accuracy and perceptiveness of some of Dreyfus's comments. Had he formulated them less aggressively, constructive actions they suggested might have been taken much earlier."

Webcasting philosophy
When UC Berkeley and Apple began making a selected number of lecture classes freely available to the public as podcasts beginning around 2006, a recording of Dreyfus teaching a course called "Man, God, and Society in Western Literature – From Gods to God and Back" rose to the 58th most popular webcast on iTunes. These webcasts have attracted the attention of many, including non-academics, to Dreyfus and his subject area.

Works

Books

 1972. What Computers Can't Do: The Limits of Artificial Intelligence.   (At Internet Archive)
2nd edition 1979 , ; 3rd edition 1992 re-titled as What Computers Still Can't Do  
1983. (with Paul Rabinow) Michel Foucault: Beyond Structuralism and Hermeneutics. Chicago, Ill: The University of Chicago Press.  (At Open Library)
1986 (with Stuart Dreyfus). Mind Over Machine: The Power of Human Intuition and Expertise in the Era of the Computer. New York: Free Press.(At Open Library)
1991. Being-in-the-World: A Commentary on Heidegger's Being and Time, Division I.Cambridge, Massachusetts: MIT Press. , 
1992. What Computers Still Can't Do: A Critique of Artificial Reason. Cambridge, Massachusetts: MIT Press.  
 1997, Disclosing New Worlds: Entrepreneurship, Democratic Action, and the Cultivation of Solidarity (co-author, with Fernando Flores and Charles Spinosa)
2001. On the Internet First Edition. London and New York: Routledge. ; 2nd edition 1979 (At Internet Archive)
2011. (with Sean Dorrance Kelly)  All Things Shining: Reading the Western Classics to Find Meaning in a Secular Age. (At Open Library)
2014 Skillful Coping: Essays on the Phenomenology of Everyday Perception and Action, Mark A. Wrathall (ed.),  
2015 (with Charles Taylor) Retrieving Realism. Harvard University Press,  
2017 Background Practices: Essays on the Understanding of Being, Mark A. Wrathall (ed.), Oxford University Press,

Festschrift
2000. Heidegger, Authenticity, and Modernity: Essays in Honor of Hubert Dreyfus, Volume 1. Cambridge, Massachusetts: MIT Press. .
2000. Heidegger, Coping, and Cognitive Science: Essays in Honor of Hubert L. Dreyfus, Volume 2. Cambridge, Massachusetts: MIT Press.

Select articles
 1965. Alchemy and Artificial Intelligence. Rand Paper.

See also 
Critique of technology
Mike Cooley

References

Criticism of AI sources 

George Lakoff and Mark Johnson, 1999. Philosophy in the Flesh: the Embodied Mind and its Challenge to Western Thought. Basic Books.

External links 
 Professor Bert Dreyfus at the Berkeley Philosophy Department Web page
 Professor Bert Dreyfus's UC Berkeley Home Page
 
 
Copy of Article "The iPod Lecture Circuit" by Michelle Quinn in LA Times, November 2007 (Archived by Wayback Machine).
Conversations with History, an interview, November 2005
Hubert Dreyfus Interview October 20, 2005
 Conversations about media, culture and technology. Interview between Andrew Keen and Hubert Dreyfus February 16, 2006 on AfterTV
Hubert Dreyfus interviewed by Bryan Magee on Husserl, Heidegger and Modern Existentialism for The Great Philosophers (1987) on YouTube
Lectures from the course "Philosophy 185 Heidegger" (2007) by Hubert Dreyfus.(audio) (on Internet Archive). [Further of his Webcast Lectures hosted there]
Professor Hubert Dreyfus - "Dostoevsky on how to Save the Sacred from Science" (video, 2015)

1929 births
2017 deaths
20th-century American philosophers
21st-century American philosophers
American ethicists
20th-century American Jews
Brandeis University faculty
American consciousness researchers and theorists
Continental philosophers
Enactive cognition
Epistemologists
Existentialists
Fellows of the American Academy of Arts and Sciences
Harvard University alumni
Heidegger scholars
Jewish philosophers
MIT School of Humanities, Arts, and Social Sciences faculty
Metaphysicians
Ontologists
Philosophers of culture
Philosophers of education
Philosophers of literature
Philosophers of mind
Philosophers of psychology
Philosophers of science
Philosophers of technology
Philosophy of artificial intelligence
Philosophy writers
Phenomenologists
Presidents of the American Philosophical Association
University of California, Berkeley College of Letters and Science faculty
21st-century American Jews